The 1959 Ivy League football season was the fourth season of college football play for the Ivy League and was part of the 1959 NCAA University Division football season. The season began on September 26, 1959, and ended on November 26, 1959. Ivy League teams were 10–5 against non-conference opponents and Penn won the conference championship.

Season overview

Schedule

Week 1

Week 2

Week 3

Week 4

Week 5

Week 6

Week 7

Week 8

Week 9

1960 NFL Draft

Two Ivy League players were drafted in the 1960 NFL draft, held in November 1959: Tom Budrewicz and Jack Hanlon.

References